The 2018 Women's Basketball Invitational (WBI) was a single-elimination tournament consisting of 16 National Collegiate Athletic Association (NCAA) Division I teams that did not participate in the 2018 NCAA Division I women's basketball tournament or 2018 Women's National Invitation Tournament. The 2018 field was announced on March 13. First round WBI games occurred on March 14 and 15; second-round games were played on March 19 and 20. The tournament semifinals were held March 23 and 24, and the 2018 WBI Championship game was held on March 29. Yale defeated Central Arkansas, 54–50, to become WBI champions.

Bracket

* - Denotes overtime

References

External links
 Women's Basketball Invitational 

Women's Basketball Invitational
Women's Basketball Invitational